The 1932 United States Senate elections in Indiana took place on November 8, 1932. Incumbent Republican Senator and Senate Majority Leader James E. Watson ran for a third term in office, but was defeated by Frederick Van Nuys in a landslide.

General election

Candidates
Evartt E. Bailey (Socialist Labor)
Ralph Green (National)
William Townsend (Communist)
Frederick Van Nuys, former U.S. Attorney for the District of Indiana and State Senator (Democratic)
Forrest Wallace (Socialist)
James E. Watson, incumbent Senator since 1916 and Senate Majority Leader (Republican)
Alson E. Wrentmore (Prohibition)

Results

See also 
 1932 United States Senate elections

References

1932
Indiana
United States Senate